The Joseph Henry Morris House is a historic mansion in Jackson, Mississippi, U.S.. It was built in 1891-1893 for Joseph Henry Morris, a veteran of the Confederate States Army during the American Civil War who later worked as an "agent" for the Illinois Central Railroad and founded an ice company. The Morris family had owned the land for generations. It was designed in the Classical Revival architectural style. It has been listed on the National Register of Historic Places since August 11, 1983.

References

Houses on the National Register of Historic Places in Mississippi
National Register of Historic Places in Jackson, Mississippi
Neoclassical architecture in Mississippi
Houses completed in 1893